The Grand Carousel, located in Memphis, Tennessee, was built in 1909 and was purchased by the Memphis Park Commission in the year 1923. The Grand Carousel's horses were hand carved by Gustav Dentzel. It is characterized as a classic merry-go-round. The Grand Carousel was added to the National Register of Historic places in 1980. It ceased operation in the fall of 2005. It has been in storage since then. Currently, the Grand Carousel has been restored. The Carousel is housed in a new facility on the campus of the Memphis Children’s Museum.

References 

Carousels in the United States
Tourist attractions in Memphis, Tennessee